Lapu-Lapu City, officially the City of Lapu-Lapu, is a 1st class highly urbanized city in the Central Visayas region of the Philippines. According to the 2020 census, it has a population of 497,604 people.

It was formerly known as Opon, the city being renamed to its present name in 1961. It is one of the cities that make up Metro Cebu in the Philippines. It is located in the province of Cebu, administratively independent from the province, but grouped under Cebu by the Philippine Statistics Authority (PSA).

Mactan–Cebu International Airport, the second busiest airport in the Philippines, is located in Lapu-Lapu City.

History

In the 16th century, Mactan Island was colonized by Spain. Augustinian friars founded the town of Opon in 1730, and it became a city in 1961. It was renamed after Datu Lapulapu, the island's chieftain, who led the defeat against the Portuguese explorer Ferdinand Magellan in 1521 in the Battle of Mactan, commemorated at Mactan Shrine in Punta Engaño, where Magellan led a landing party of 40 men to resupply who were set upon by 1,500 locals and slew their captain and a few other men.

The municipality of Opon was founded by the Augustinian missionaries in 1730. It was ceded to the Jesuits in 1737, and later restored to the Augustinians. When the Philippine Revolution spread to the Visayas in 1898, the people organized themselves into local revolutionary units.

During the Filipino-American War, a military government was established. The continued resistance of the people of Cebu prompted the American government to restore military control over the province on July 17, 1901. In 1905, Opon held its first municipal election, and Pascual dela Serna was elected town president.

Following the outbreak of World War II, the presence of bulk oil storage tanks in Opon made the town an object of Japanese raids a week after the outbreak of WWII in December 1941.  The enemy aircraft succeeded in blowing up two of about fourteen oil storage tanks in Opon.  A unit of the Kawaguchi Detachment of the Japanese Imperial Forces landed on the east coast of Cebu on April 10, 1942.  Later, the resistance movement was organized by Colonel James M. Cushing, leader of the southern and central units, and Harry Fenton of the northern unit of the Cebu Resistance Movement.

During the Battle of the Visayas, Victor II operations of the American Division led by Major General William Arnold landed in Cebu on March 26, 1945, and subsequently liberated the province.

Historically, the city includes the site of the Battle of Mactan.  On August 1, 1973, by virtue of Presidential Decree No. 2060, President Ferdinand E. Marcos declared the site of the battle a national shrine; the preservation, restoration and/or reconstruction of which shall be under the supervision and control of the National Historical Commission in collaboration with the Department of Tourism.  Mactan is also the birthplace of Leonila Dimataga-Garcia, wife of Carlos P. Garcia, the fourth President of the Republic.  Leonila Dimataga-Garcia was a relative of the wife of Lapu-Lapu City's former mayor Ernest Weigel Jr. (1992-2001, three terms) who was the richest mayor in Metro Cebu, with a net worth of ₱57 million in the early 2000s.

Cityhood

Congressman Manuel A. Zosa, the representative of the Sixth District of Cebu, sponsored the Bill converting the former municipality of Opon into the present day city of Lapu-Lapu.  This was the Republic Act 3134, known as the City Charter of Lapu-Lapu, which was signed on June 17, 1961, by Philippine President Carlos P. Garcia.  Lapu-Lapu was inaugurated on December 31, 1961, with Mariano Dimataga, the last municipal mayor, as the first city mayor.

Highly urbanized city
On January 23, 2007, Lapu-Lapu was proclaimed as HUC via Proclamation No. 1222, signed by President Gloria Macapagal Arroyo. Its plebiscite was held along with Puerto Princesa in Palawan on July 21, 2007. Both of them successfully became highly urbanized cities after majority of their voters voted in favor of conversion. They ranked 31st and 32nd in the country.

Geography
Lapu-Lapu is bounded on the north by the main island of Cebu, to the west by Cebu City and Mactan Channel, on the east by the Camotes Sea, and on the south by the town of Cordova.

The city occupies Mactan Island, a few kilometers off the main island of Cebu.  It also has some of the barangays under its jurisdiction on the Olango Island Group. The city is linked to Mandaue on mainland Cebu by the Mactan-Mandaue Bridge and Marcelo Fernan Bridges.

Barangays
Lapu-Lapu comprises 30 barangays:

Climate

Demographics

Lapu-Lapu's residents mainly speak Cebuano, the local language. Tagalog and English is also widely spoken and understood, due to the influx of foreign nationals in the city. Due to the large number of resorts and retirement homes in the city, as well as the growing number of ESL schools, the city also hosts a number of Japanese, Korean, and Chinese speakers.

Economy 

Lapu-Lapu City is part of Metro Cebu, the second-most important metropolitan area in the Philippines. It has benefited from the economic rise of Cebu in the 1990s and 2000s, also known as Ceboom.

Mactan–Cebu International Airport, the primary airport serving Cebu, is located in the city. The airport has direct routes with international destinations, including East and Southeast Asia. These connections have given way for tourism to emerge as a major part of the city's economy. Several resorts are located in the city, most of which are concentrated along the eastern coast of the island in the barangays of Marigondon, Maribago, Mactan, and Punta Engaño.

The city is home to several industrial zones, such as Mactan Export Processing Zone (MEPZ) and the Cebu Light Industrial Park (CLIP). Other large industries include: General Milling Company, one of the largest food companies in the Philippines; the Cebu Shipyard and Engineering Works, pioneered by Dad Cleland; and several oil companies, such as Royal Dutch Shell.

Government

Mariano Dimataga's term was interrupted during the years 1941-1945.  Teodulo Tomakin and later Eugenio Araneta were appointed as town mayors.  They later escaped from the Japanese, Jorge Tampus took over.  During the Allied liberation by the combined Filipino-American forces, year 1945 Mariano Dimataga resumed his interrupted term.

Transportation

Mactan–Cebu International Airport (MCIA) is located in this city, which is connected to mainland Cebu via the Marcelo Fernan Bridge and Mactan-Mandaue Bridges, as well as the Cebu–Cordova Link Expressway (located in the nearby town of Cordova), over the sea separating the Mactan island from the island of Cebu.  The airport is the main gateway to Cebu and Central Visayas, serving international flights to various destinations, especially to Singapore, Macau, Hong Kong, South Korea, Japan, and Taiwan.  MCIA is also the second busiest airport in the Philippines, after Ninoy Aquino International Airport in Manila.

Gallery

Notable people
 Lapulapu - A chieftain of Mactan and the First Philippine National Hero who defeated Magellan.
 Janine Berdin - The grand winner of the second season of Tawag ng Tanghalan.
 Akiko Solon - Finalist of Star Power: Sharon Search For the Next Female Superstar.

See also
List of renamed cities and municipalities in the Philippines

Notes

References

Sources

External links

 [ Philippine Standard Geographic Code]
Lapu-Lapu City government website
About Lapu-Lapu City

 
Cities in Cebu
Highly urbanized cities in the Philippines
Populated places established in 1730
1730 establishments in the Philippines
Cities in Metro Cebu
Island cities in the Philippines